Dunfermline East was a constituency of the Scottish Parliament (Holyrood). It elected one Member of the Scottish Parliament (MSP) by the plurality (first past the post) method of election.

From the 2011 Scottish Parliament election, parts of the Dunfermline East constituency were merged with the old Dunfermline West seat to form a single Dunfermline constituency, while a new constituency of Cowdenbeath was created from the remaining area.

Electoral region 

The region covers all of the Clackmannanshire council area, all of the Fife council area, all of the Perth and Kinross council area, all of the Stirling council area and parts of the Angus council area.

Constituency boundaries and council area 

The  constituency was created at the same time as the Scottish Parliament, in 1999, with the name and boundaries of a pre-existing Westminster (House of Commons) constituency. In 2005, however, Scottish Westminster constituencies were mostly replaced with new constituencies. The Dunfermline East Westminster constituency was divided between Dunfermline and West Fife and Kirkcaldy and Cowdenbeath.

The Holyrood constituency of Dunfermline East was one of five Mid Scotland and Fife constituencies covering the Fife council area, the others being Dunfermline West, Fife Central, Fife North East and Kirkcaldy. All were entirely within the council area.

Dunfermline East covered a south-western portion of the council area, with Dunfermline West to the west, Fife Central to the northeast and Kirkcaldy to the east.

Constituency profile 

The constituency contains no part of the town of Dunfermline, which is within the Dunfermline West constituency. (The pre-existing Westminster constituency was created during the period, 1975 to 1996, of local government regions and districts, when there was Dunfermline district of the Fife local government region. In 1996, regions and districts were replaced with unitary council areas.)

Cowdenbeath is the largest town in the constituency, and most of the constituency area was once part of the Fife coalfield, on the north bank of the Firth of Forth. The region has economic troubles, and the closure of the Rosyth naval base and the troubles at the naval dockyard have not helped.

Statistically, this was one of Labour’s safest seats in Scotland. In the House of Commons, there had been a Labour Member of Parliament (MP) for the area since 1950. Gordon Brown, the former prime minister, was MP for the Dunfermline East Westminster constituency from 1983 to 2005. He was subsequently MP for the Kirkcaldy and Cowdenbeath constituency, where his majority at the 2010 general election was over 15,000.

Member of the Scottish Parliament

Election results

Footnotes 

Scottish Parliament constituencies and regions 1999–2011
1999 establishments in Scotland
Constituencies established in 1999
2011 disestablishments in Scotland
Constituencies disestablished in 2011
Politics of Fife
Cowdenbeath
Inverkeithing
Kelty
Dalgety Bay
Lochgelly